The 2017–18 Belgian Basketball Cup was the 64th edition of the national cup competition for men's basketball in Belgium. The season started on 26 September 2017 and ended on 11 March 2018 with the final. Oostende won its sixth straight cup title.

Format
Teams from the Basketball League Belgium Division I, the Top Division 1 and Top Division 2 (the first three divisions in Belgian basketball) compete in the competition. In the first round teams from the Top Division I and 2 play in 12 groups. From the second round, teams from the BLB Division I enter the competition. In the second round, the quarter- and semi-finals a double legged format is used. When a Division I  team faces off against a team from a lower league, no second leg is played. The Final is decided by a single game.

Bracket

See also
2017–18 Basketball League Belgium Division I

References

Belgian Basketball Cup
Cup